The Swan River Colony, also known as the Swan River Settlement, or just Swan River, was a British colony established in 1829 on the Swan River, in Western Australia. This initial settlement place on the Swan River was soon named Perth, and it became the capital city of Western Australia.

The name was a pars pro toto for Western Australia. On 6 February 1832 the colony was renamed the Colony of Western Australia, when the colony's founding lieutenant-governor, Captain James Stirling, belatedly received his commission. However, the name "Swan River Colony" remained in informal use for many years afterwards.

European exploration

The first recorded Europeans to sight land where the city of Perth is now located were Dutch sailors. His records indicate he first reached the Western Australian coast at latitude 32°20', which is approximately at Warnbro Sound. He did not land because of heavy surf, and so proceeded northwards without much investigation.

Of the 193 on board, only 75 made it to shore. A small boat that survived the wreckage then sailed to Batavia for help, but a subsequent search party found none of the survivors. The wreck was rediscovered in 1963.

In 1658, three Dutch Republic ships, also partially searching for Vergulde Draeck visited the area. Waekende Boey under Captain S. Volckertszoon, Elburg under Captain J. Peereboom and Emeloort under Captain A. Joncke sighted Rottnest but did not proceed any closer to the mainland because of the many reefs. They then travelled north and subsequently found the wreck of Vergulde Draeck (but still no survivors). They gave an unfavourable opinion of the area partly due to the dangerous reefs.

The Dutch captain Willem de Vlamingh was the next European in the area. Commanding three ships, Geelvinck, Nijptangh and Weseltje, he arrived at and named Rottnest on 29 December 1696, and on 10 January 1697 visited and named the Swan River. His ships could not sail up the river because of a sand bar at its mouth, so he sent out a sloop which even then required some dragging over the sand bar. They sailed until reaching mud flats probably near Heirisson Island. They saw some Aboriginal people but were not able to meet any close up. Vlamingh was also not impressed with the area, and this was probably the reason for a lack of Dutch exploration from then on.

In 1801, the French ships Géographe captained by Nicolas Baudin and Naturaliste captained by Emmanuel Hamelin visited the area from the south. While Géographe continued northwards, Naturaliste remained for a few weeks. A small expedition dragged longboats over the sand bar and explored the Swan River. They also gave unfavourable descriptions regarding any potential settlement due to many mud flats upstream and the sand bar (the sand bar wasn't removed until the 1890s when  O'Connor built Fremantle harbour).

Later in March 1803, Géographe with another ship Casuarina passed by Rottnest on their way eventually back to France, but did not stop longer than a day or two.

The next visit to the area was the first Australian-born maritime explorer, Phillip Parker King in 1822 on Bathurst. King was also the son of former Governor Philip Gidley King of New South Wales. However, King also was not impressed with the area.

Background to the settlement

He was accompanied by Charles Fraser, the New South Wales botanist.

Their initial exploration began on 8 March in a cutter and gig with parties continuing on foot from 13 March. In late March,  moved to Sydney, arriving there on 15 April. Stirling arrived back in England in July 1828, promoting in glowing terms the agricultural potential of the area. His lobbying was for the establishment of a "free" settlementunlike penal colonies at New South Wales, Port Arthur and Norfolk Islandin the Swan River area with himself as its governor. As a result of these reports, and a rumour in London that the French were about to establish a penal colony in the western part of Australia, possibly at Shark Bay, the Colonial Office assented to the proposal in mid-October 1828.

In December 1828 a Secretary of State for Colonies despatch reserved land for the Crown, as well as for the clergy, and for education, and specified that water frontage was to be rationed. The most cursory exploration had preceded the British decision to found a settlement at the Swan River; the most makeshift arrangements were to govern its initial establishment and the granting of land; and the most sketchy surveys were to be made before the grants were actually occupied. A set of regulations were worked out for distributing land to settlers on the basis of land grants. Negotiations for a privately run settlement were also started with a consortium of four gentlemen headed by Potter McQueen, a member of Parliament who had already acquired a large tract of land in New South Wales. The consortium withdrew after the Colonial Office refused to give it preference over independent settlers in selecting land, but one member, Thomas Peel, accepted the terms and proceeded alone. Peel was allocated , conditional on his arrival at the settlement before 1 November 1829 with 400 settlers. Peel arrived after this date with only 300 settlers, but was still granted .

Events of the settlement

After she anchored off Garden Island on 25 April 1829, Captain Charles Fremantle declared the Swan River Colony for Britain on 2 May 1829.

 arrived on 31 May carrying Stirling and his party and  arrived on 8 June carrying members of the 63rd Regiment and families.

A series of accidents followed the arrivals which probably nearly caused the abandonment of the expedition. Challenger and Sulphur both struck rocks while entering Cockburn Sound and were fortunate to escape with only minor damage. Parmelia however, under Stirling's "over confident pilotage", also ran aground, lost her rudder and damaged her keel, which necessitated extensive repairs. With winter now set in, the settlers were obliged to land on Garden Island. Bad weather and the required repairs meant that Stirling did not manage to reach the mainland until 18 June, and the remaining settlers on Parmelia finally arrived in early August. In early September a major disaster occurred: Marquis of Anglesea was driven ashore during a gale and wrecked beyond repair. The ship did not break up, as had been expected, but instead survived to become Western Australia's first prison hulk.

The first reports of the new colony arrived back in England in late January 1830. They described the poor conditions and the starving state of the colonists, deemed the land totally unfit for agriculture, and reported (incorrectly) that the settlers had abandoned the colony. As a result of these reports, many people cancelled their migration plans or diverted to Cape Town in South Africa, or to the more well-established New South Wales colony.

Nevertheless, a few settlers arrived and additional stores were dispatched. By 1832 the population of the colony had reached about 1,500. Aboriginal people were not counted at that time, but in the south west have been estimated to number 15,000. The difficulty of clearing land to grow crops was so great that by 1850 the population of settlers had increased only to 5,886. This population had settled mainly around the southwestern coastline at Bunbury, Augusta and Albany.

Karl Marx,  in Das Kapital, used the Swan River Colony to illustrate a point about the necessity of a dependent workforce for capitalist production and colonization.

See also

General view of the botany of the vicinity of Swan River, an 1831 scientific paper by Scottish botanist Robert Brown
History of Perth, Western Australia
History of Western Australia
Convict era of Western Australia

References

Further reading
 Fornasiero, Jean; Monteath, Peter and West-Sooby, John. Encountering Terra Australis: the Australian voyages of Nicholas Baudin and Matthew Flinders, Kent Town, South Australia,Wakefield Press,2004. 
 Marchant, Leslie R. France Australe : the French search for the Southland and subsequent explorations and plans to found a penal colony and strategic base in south western Australia 1503–1826 Perth : Scott Four Colour Print, c1998. 
 Marchant, Leslie R. French Napoleonic Placenames of the South West Coast, Greenwood, WA. R.I.C. Publications, 2004. 
 Niendorf, Matthew J. "'A Land Not Exactly Flowing with Milk & Honey': Swan River Mania in the British Isles and Western Australia 1827-1832," Dissertations, Theses, and Masters Projects, 2016. 
 Straw, Leigh S.L. A Semblance of Scotland: Scottish Identity in Colonial Western Australia, The Grimsay Press, 2006. 
 Toft, Klaus The Navigators – Flinders vs Baudin, Sydney, Duffy and Snellgrove, 2002. 

Populated places established in 1829
Australian penal colonies
Convictism in Western Australia
1829 establishments in Australia
19th century in Western Australia
Colony of Western Australia